Ternivka is a city in Pavlohrad Raion, Dnipropetrovsk Oblast (province) of Ukraine. It hosts the administration of Ternivka urban hromada, one of the hromadas of Ukraine. Population: . Population was 29,226 (2001).

History
In April 1930 the village was the centre of a quickly defeated pro-Ukrainian anti-Soviet Union revolt.

Until 18 July 2020, Ternivka was incorporated as a city of oblast significance and the centre of Ternivka Municipality. The municipality was abolished in July 2020 as part of the administrative reform of Ukraine, which reduced the number of raions of Dnipropetrovsk Oblast to seven. The area of Ternivka Municipality was merged into Pavlohrad Raion.

Industries
Coal mining.  Ternivska, Zakhidno-Donbaska, Dniprovska and Samarska coal mines  are located at the outskirts of Ternivka.

Gallery

References

Cities in Dnipropetrovsk Oblast
Yekaterinoslav Governorate
Cities of regional significance in Ukraine
Populated places established in the Russian Empire